All Is Violent, All Is Bright is the second studio album by Irish post-rock band God Is an Astronaut, released in 2005. The enhanced CD also contains an mp3 of the song "Disturbance". The album was digitally remastered and re-released in 2011

Track listing

References

2005 albums
Revive Records albums
God Is an Astronaut albums